Duchess Jutta of Mecklenburg-Strelitz (Augusta Charlotte Jutta Alexandra Georgina Adophine; 24 January 1880 – 17 February 1946) was a member of the House of Mecklenburg-Strelitz and the consort of Crown Prince Danilo of Montenegro. When a married woman, she was known as Militza.

Early life and marriage
Duchess Auguste Charlotte Jutta Alexandra Georgina Adolphine of Mecklenburg-Strelitz was born in Neustrelitz, the youngest daughter of the then Hereditary Grand Duke of Mecklenburg-Strelitz, Adolf Friedrich and his wife Princess Elisabeth of Anhalt. Along with her sister Marie, Jutta was raised by governesses and had little contact with her parents. The atmosphere of Carolinenpalais was noted for its rigor and need for etiquette. A scandal broke out when her 19-year-old sister became pregnant by a palace servant.

Through the influence of the German Emperor, William II, her marriage to the heir apparent of Montenegro Prince Danilo was arranged. Hours after her arrival at Antivari in Montenegro she converted to the Orthodox faith. She was accompanied by her future brother in law the Crown Prince of Italy, Victor Emmanuel as she made her way to Cetinje for her wedding. She married Prince Danilo on 27 July 1899. After her marriage and conversion to Orthodoxy she took the name Militza.

World War I and later life
During the First World War, Montenegro fought against the Central Powers which included the country of her birth, the German Empire. These links did not stop her from being a target; the villa in Antivari where she was staying was bombed by Austrian aircraft. After the war, the Royal Family established a government in exile after Montenegro was incorporated into the new Kingdom of Serbs, Croats and Slovenes. Her father-in-law King Nicholas I died on 1 March 1921 and her husband succeeded as titular King of Montenegro. He only held the position for a week before abdicating in favour of his nephew Michael.

Jutta spent the rest of her life in exile. She and her husband lived in France. Danilo died in Vienna in 1939. Jutta died in Rome where her brother-in-law King Victor Emmanuel III reigned.

Titles and honours
 24 January 1880 – 27 July 1899: Her Highness Duchess Jutta of Mecklenburg-Strelitz 
 27 July 1899 – 28 August 1910: Her Highness The Hereditary Princess of Montenegro
 28 August 1910 – 1 March 1921: Her Royal Highness The Crown Princess of Montenegro
 In pretence: 1 – 7 March 1921: Her Majesty The Queen of Montenegro
 7 March 1921 – 17 February 1946: Her Royal Highness Princess Danilo of Montenegro

Ancestors

References

Sources

External links

Queen Militza of Montenegro - mecklenburg-strelitz.org

1880 births
1946 deaths
Converts to Eastern Orthodoxy from Lutheranism
Duchesses of Mecklenburg-Strelitz
House of Mecklenburg-Strelitz
People from Neustrelitz
German people of English descent
German expatriates in France
Montenegrin expatriates in France
Montenegrin people of English descent
German emigrants to Montenegro
Montenegrin people of German descent
Daughters of monarchs